Crab Lake is a lake in St. Louis County, in the U.S. state of Minnesota.

Crab Lake was so named on account of its outline being shaped like a crab.

See also
List of lakes in Minnesota

References

Lakes of Minnesota
Lakes of St. Louis County, Minnesota